Midwestern University (MWU) is a private medical and professional school with campuses in Downers Grove, Illinois and Glendale, Arizona. As of the 2020–21 academic year, a total of 2,987 students were enrolled at the Downers Grove campus and 3,902 were enrolled at the Glendale campus.

Founded in 1900 as the American College of Osteopathic Medicine and Surgery, the Chicago College of Osteopathic Medicine is the fourth-oldest medical school currently active in Illinois.  Over the years, the university expanded, adding additional degrees and programs; in 1993, the school united these programs under the name Midwestern University. In 1995, the school opened a campus in Glendale, Arizona, becoming the second and largest medical school to teach students in the state. The university is accredited by the Higher Learning Commission and the medical schools are also accredited by the American Osteopathic Association's Commission on Osteopathic College Accreditation.

History

The university was founded in 1900 as the American College of Osteopathic Medicine and Surgery. The school was the fourth medical school in the world to grant the Doctor of Osteopathic Medicine (D.O.) degree, and the first in the state of Illinois. Originally located on Washington Boulevard in Chicago, the school moved to Hyde Park in 1918. In 1913, the school changed its name to the Chicago College of Osteopathy, eventually becoming the Chicago College of Osteopathic Medicine.

In 1986, the Chicago College of Osteopathic Medicine moved from its prior location in Hyde Park to a new campus in the western suburb of Downers Grove, Illinois.  In 1991, the Chicago College of Pharmacy opened.  The College of Health Sciences began in 1992. In 1993, the Board of Trustees unanimously approved a single educational mission for the institution, uniting the Chicago College of Osteopathic Medicine, the Chicago College of Pharmacy, and the Chicago College of Health Sciences into Midwestern University. In 2009, the College of Dental Medicine-Illinois opened, followed by the Chicago College of Optometry in 2014 and the College of Graduate Studies in 2018.

In 1996, the university opened a new campus in Glendale, Arizona.  The first college at the Glendale campus was the Arizona College of Osteopathic Medicine, which began its first courses in 1996.  The college joined the University of Arizona College of Medicine as one of only two medical schools in Arizona at the time, and it remained the only osteopathic medical school in the state until AT Still University opened in Mesa in 2007. In 1997, a physician assistant program was established at the Glendale campus, followed by the College of Pharmacy the next year. In 2006, the College of Dental Medicine-Arizona opened, then the Arizona College of Optometry opened in 2008, and the College of Veterinary Medicine opened in 2012. The College of Health Sciences' podiatric medicine program became the Arizona College of Podiatric Medicine in 2020.
In 2010, the university received a Conservation and Native Landscaping Awards from the Environmental Protection Agency for restoring 9 acres of wetland and oak-hickory woods on the Downers Grove campus. In 2012, the Downers Grove Multispecialty Clinic opened in a five-story, 193,000 square foot building at a cost of $112 million. Also that year, the College of Veterinary Medicine opened at the Glendale campus, at a cost of $90 million, with a 109,000-square-foot veterinary teaching hospital, a 36,000-square-foot large animal teaching facility, and a 76,000-square-foot classroom building.  The school was the first veterinary medical school in the state of Arizona, and was the 29th veterinary medical school in the United States.

Academics and accreditation
Midwestern University offers multiple academic programs at two campus locations. All programs are graduate-level and focus on the health professions. The university is accredited by the Higher Learning Commission. 

Doctoral degree programs include:
 Doctor of Osteopathic Medicine
 Doctor of Dental Medicine
 Doctor of Nurse Anesthesia Practice
 Doctor of Occupational Therapy
 Doctor of Pharmacy
 Doctor of Physical Therapy
 Doctor of Podiatric Medicine
 Doctor of Psychology
 Doctor of Optometry
 Doctor of Veterinary Medicine
 Doctor of Nursing Practice.

The university also offers the following degrees:
 Master of Arts (M.A.)
 Master of Biomedical Sciences (M.B.S.)
 Master of Medical Sciences (M.M.S.)
 Master of Nurse Anesthesia Practice (M.S.)
 Master of Occupational Therapy (M.O.T.)
 Master of Public Health (M.P.H.)
 Master of Science in Nursing (M.S.N.)
 Master of Cardiovascular Science - Perfusion (M.S.)

Research
Midwestern University researches a variety of areas related to health and biomedical science. Areas of research include environmental toxicology (as a part of the One Health Initiative), COVID-19, pharmacology, physiology, and anatomy. As of the 2020-2021 academic year, the university held $1,603,231 in active externally funded research awards. Sources of funding for research include: National Institutes of Health, National Science Foundation, Health Resources & Services Administration, American Heart Association, American Optometric Foundation, HonorHealth, Leakey Foundation, Marfan Foundation, PhRMA Foundation, PetSmart Charities, Alzheimer’s Drug Discovery Foundation, National Assoc. of Chain Drug Stores, Pharmaceutical Research & Manufacturers of America Foundation, etc.

Campuses

Downers Grove, Illinois
The Downers Grove campus is located on a  site in Downers Grove, Illinois, a suburban area 25 miles west of downtown Chicago. Students enjoy a 105-acre campus in Downers Grove nestled serenely within a rolling, wooded setting. The campus features the following facilities:
 Littlejohn Hall, the library technology center with extensive book, journal, and electronic collections linked by a computerized system, a medical informatics laboratory, a large multi-sectional auditorium and comfortable lounge and study areas.
 Alumni Hall, an academic facility with state-of-the-art osteopathic manipulative therapy, physical therapy and occupational therapy labs, classrooms, research facilities and faculty offices.
 Centennial Hall composed of a pharmacy practice laboratory, three research laboratories, and two 258-seat lecture halls/classrooms.
 Recreation and Wellness Hall featuring a fully equipped weight room, an aerobic exercise room, racquetball/handball courts, a gymnasium, craft room, and music room. Additional recreational facilities include athletic fields for intramural sports.
 The six-story Redwood Hall features the Dorothy and Ward Perrin Interfaith Chapel, kitchens, classrooms, an auditorium, and residence hall rooms.
 The Commons student center houses the campus bookstore, mailroom, a full-service dining hall, coffee shop, computer lab and administrative offices.
 Dr. Arthur G. Dobbelaere Support Services Hall provides space for administrative offices including Student Financial Services, the Registrar’s Office, Alumni Relations, Media Resources, Business Services, Information Technology, and more.
 Science Hall, a five-story academic building with modern classrooms, research laboratories, dental simulation clinic, student testing center, and faculty offices.
 Cardinal Hall, the 137,000 square-foot building includes a large auditorium space that can be used for campus-wide ceremonies and also be divided into five large lecture halls. The building also includes additional classrooms, a simulation center, and academic office space.
 White Oak Hall, named in honor of the official state tree of Illinois, features classrooms, offices, and fully-equipped optometry laboratories. The building also includes a 24-hour student study room with a separate entrance, kitchenette, and vending machines.

Glendale, Arizona

The Glendale campus is located on a  site in Glendale, Arizona, a suburban area 15 miles northwest of downtown Phoenix. Facilities on the campus include:
 Arthur G. Dobbelaere Science Hall, housing administrative offices, classrooms, and laboratory spaces (68,800 sq ft)
 Cactus Wren Hall, containing lecture halls, conference rooms, and classrooms (78,000 sq ft).
 Sahuaro Hall, with lecture halls, conference rooms, and laboratory classrooms boasting the finest in educational equipment and medical resources (64,850 sq ft).
 Cholla Hall, with two lecture auditoria, modern pharmacy laboratories, multi-use classrooms, and a computer lab (37,976 sq ft).
 Ocotillo Hall, with cutting-edge practice labs, classrooms, and a 600-seat dividable auditorium (40,000 sq ft).
 Agave Hall, with state-of-the-art anatomy and osteopathic manipulative medicine labs, as well as several multi-purpose spaces (40,000 sq ft).
 Glendale Hall, featuring classrooms, faculty offices, and a dental simulation lab (130,000 sq. ft.).
 Foothills Science Center, which houses faculty research facilities (26,765 sq ft).
 Mesquite Hall, home of the Clinical Skills & Simulation Center which offers human and technology-based simulation models for MWU students to practice clinical skills; features 19 clinical and 6 specialty exam rooms, a mock OR/ER, scrub room, and student testing/faculty observation areas with high-resolution video.
 2,600-seat Auditorium with classroom space for lectures and large campus events (40,000 sq ft).
 Recreation & Wellness Hall, with gymnasium and exercise facilities, and special rooms for music, crafts, and dance/aerobics (26,135 sq ft).
 Four Barrel Student Center buildings, which are home to University departments including Admissions, Financial Aid, University Relations, Communications, Human Resources, Information Technology, Campus Security, and the Stagecoach Dining Hall.  Student amenities include lounges, game room, and outdoor basketball courts and a sand volleyball court.
 Comprehensive medical library with computer resources and study rooms.
 Chanen Interfaith Chapel, with space for personal reflection, student organizations, special events

Patient care
Midwestern University operates several clinics on both its Downers Grove and Glendale campuses. The Downers Grove Multispecialty Clinic opened in 2012 and includes medical, dental, speech-language, physical therapy, and optometry services. Through five community clinics located on the Glendale campus, the university provides medical, dental, podiatry, optometry, mental health, physical and occupational therapy, and veterinary services. The Companion Animal Clinic is part of the larger Animal Health Institute, which also includes a Large Animal Clinic and a Diagnostic Pathology Center.

Students

Nearly 7,000 students were in attendance at Midwestern University for the 2020-21 academic year (both campuses).  There were 2,980 students in attendance at the Downers Grove campus, with 63% female, 37% male, 58% white, 27% Asian, 6% Hispanic or Latino, and 2% Black or African American. At the Glendale campus, there were 3,927 students in attendance, with 57% female, 43% male, 59% white, 17% Asian, 10% Hispanic or Latino, and 3% Black or African American.

Students at Midwestern University participate in numerous clubs on campus and an active student government association. There are several professional fraternities on campus, including Alpha Omega, Delta Sigma Delta, Kappa Psi, Phi Delta Chi, Psi Chi, Rho Chi, Rho Pi Phi, Sigma Sigma Phi, Beta Sigma Kappa, and Phi Lambda Sigma.  The behavioral medicine club hosts an improvisation show, which benefits charities.  Additional clubs and organizations on campus include:

Alumni 
More than 25,000 alumni have graduated from Midwestern University. Notable alumni include:

 Clinton E. Adams,  – retired Rear Admiral of the Navy, former medical school Dean (Western University), and current President and CEO of Rocky Vista University.
 Ivan Edwards,  - ex-pastor, United States Air Force Reserve Flight surgeon, community activist, humanitarian, public speaker.
 Victor Lindlahr,  – radio presenter and health food writer
 Joseph Mercola,  – alternative medicine proponent and Internet business personality.
 Rudy Moise,  – former colonel of the United States Air Force, lawyer and politician
 Douglas J. Robb,  - retired United States Air Force lieutenant general, prior Director of the Defense Health Agency, Command Surgeon of the Air Mobility Command (AMC) and of the United States Central Command (USCENTCOM).
 Richard Scheuring,  – NASA flight surgeon.
 Emily Temple-Wood,  – 2016 Wikimedian of the Year
 James N. Weinstein,  – Microsoft executive and former president and CEO of Dartmouth-Hitchcock health system

See also

List of dental schools in the United States
List of medical schools in the United States
List of optometry schools
List of pharmacy schools in the United States

References

Further reading

External links
 Official website

 
Private universities and colleges in Illinois
Private universities and colleges in Arizona
Medical schools in Arizona
Osteopathic medical schools in the United States
Podiatric medical schools in the United States
Pharmacy schools in Illinois
Pharmacy schools in Arizona
Educational institutions established in 1900
Downers Grove, Illinois
Buildings and structures in Glendale, Arizona
Education in Glendale, Arizona
Optometry schools in the United States
Universities and colleges in DuPage County, Illinois
Universities and colleges in Maricopa County, Arizona
1900 establishments in Illinois
Dental schools in Illinois
Nursing schools in Arizona
Dental schools in Arizona
Veterinary schools in the United States